Loch of Livister is a loch of southern-central Whalsay, Shetland Islands, Scotland, located to the north of the Loch of Huxter. Though the Loch of Livister is a much smaller loch than the Loch of Huxter, it has richer biodiversity, with Notonectidae, Coleoptera kotifera, and others.

References

 

Lochs of Whalsay